José António Rondão Almeida ComIH (born in Elvas) is a Portuguese politician.

He is Mayor (president of the Municipal Chamber) of Elvas since 27 September 2021. He was also Mayor between 4 January 1993 and 12 October 2013 (reelected in 1997, 2001, 2005 and 2009).

Rondão Almeida was forced to step down as Mayor after the 2013 local election because the new electoral law made him unable to seek another consecutive reelection. He was succeeded by Nuno Mocinha, who was Deputy Mayor under him, and continued working in the City Hall on a different role.

In May 2016, after falling apart with Mayor Mocinha, Rondão Almeida announced he was going to run again to the position of Mayor as an independent. His party was second in the 2017 elections. However, he ran again in the 2021 elections, and won. 

Some important structures built in Elvas (using public funds) during his terms are named after him, including the main concert hall, the underground car park, an entire neighbourhood in a nearby village, a care home, some main roads, and there are plaques all over the municipality with his name on every new or refurbished structure inaugurated by him.

See also 
Elvas

External links
Camara Municipal de Elvas

Living people
Socialist Party (Portugal) politicians
1945 births
People from Elvas